The 1975 Central Michigan Chippewas football team represented Central Michigan University in the Mid-American Conference (MAC) during the 1975 NCAA Division I football season. In their ninth season under head coach Roy Kramer, the Chippewas compiled an 8–2–1 record (4–1–1 against MAC opponents), finished in second place in the MAC standings, held eight of eleven opponents to fewer than 10 points, and outscored all opponents, 309 to 102. The team played its home games in Perry Shorts Stadium in Mount Pleasant, Michigan, with attendance of 105,600 in six home games.

Central Michigan made its debut at the NCAA Division I level during the 1975 season, having won the NCAA Division II Football Championship in 1974. The 1975 season was also the program's first as a member of the MAC. On September 6, 1975, the Chippewas defeated Western Michigan, 34–0, in their Division I and MAC debuts. The game was played before a record crowd of 20,800 at Perry Shorts Stadium. Central Michigan running back Walt "Smoke" Hodges rushed for 147 yards.

The team's two losses came in close games against Northern Michigan (16–17) and Ball State (13–16).  The team also played Ohio to a 6–6 tie.  The team did not play a game against MAC champion Miami (OH).

The team's statistical leaders included quarterback Ron Rummel with 586 passing yards, running back Walt Hodges with 1,025 rushing yards, and John Fossen with 211 receiving yards.  Center Wes Gamble received the team's most valuable player award. Running back Walt Hodges, defensive back Jim Jones, defensive tackle John Neuman, and linebacker Bill Schmidt received first-team All-MAC honors.

Schedule

References

Central Michigan
Central Michigan Chippewas football seasons
Central Michigan Chippewas football